Hispanognatha is a monotypic genus of  long-jawed orb-weavers containing the single species, Hispanognatha guttata. It was first described by E. B. Bryant in 1945 from a male found on Hispaniola.

See also
 List of Tetragnathidae species

References

Monotypic Araneomorphae genera
Spiders of the Caribbean
Tetragnathidae